The Art of the Faker is an influential 1959 book on art forgery by Frank Arnau.

Editions and translations
1959 Kunst der Fälscher - Fälscher der Kunst. 3000 Jahre Betrug mit Antiquitäten. (Original German edition)
1960 L'Art des faussaires et les faussaires de l'art (French translation by Édith Vincent)
1960 Arte della falsificazione, falsificazione dell'arte (Italian translation by Piero Bernardini, published in Milan)
1961 The art of the faker: three thousand years of deception in art and antiques (English translation by J. Maxwell Brownjohn, published in London)
1961 El Arte De Falsificar El Arte : Tres Mil Años De Fraudes En El Comercio De Antigüedades (Spanish translation by Juan Godó Costa, published in Barcelona)

See also
Alceo Dossena

External links
Two snipped previews at google books The art of the faker: three thousand years of deception and Three thousand years of deception in art and antiques

German non-fiction books
Art forgery
1959 non-fiction books